Robin Baker  may refer to:

Robin Baker (biologist) (born 1944), British evolutionary biologist and author of Sperm Wars
Robin Baker (academic) (born 1953), British academic and Vice-Chancellor of Canterbury Christ Church University